Snarford is a village and civil parish in the West Lindsey district of Lincolnshire, England. It is in the civil parish of Friesthorpe.

Snarford is listed in the Domesday Book of 1086 as "Snardesforde", with 18 households. 

The Grade I listed parish church is dedicated to Saint Lawrence and dates from the 12th century. It was altered and extended in the 13th and 14th centuries and restored in 1853. It  contains a collection of monuments to Thomas St Paul and Sir George St Paul, 1st Baronet and also to Robert Rich, 1st Earl of Warwick. 
Snarford Hall, the seat of the St Paul family, no longer exists.

The Hospital of Sir George St Paul is a registered charity of four almshouses for local "poor persons of good character" set up by Sir George St Paul.

The Manor House is a Grade II listed limestone farmhouse dating from the 17th century, with 19th-century alterations.

References

External links

Villages in Lincolnshire
Civil parishes in Lincolnshire
West Lindsey District